Karagayly (Qarağaylı) is a rural locality (a village) in Abzakovsky Selsoviet, Beloretsky District, Bashkortostan, Russia. The population was 4 as of 2010. There are 2 streets.

Geography 
Karagayly is located 13 km east of Beloretsk (the district's administrative centre) by road. Uraltau is the nearest rural locality.

References 

Rural localities in Beloretsky District